The Carolina chickadee (Poecile carolinensis) is a small passerine bird in the tit family Paridae.

Taxonomy 
The Carolina chickadee is often placed in the genus Parus with most other tits, but mtDNA cytochrome b sequence data and morphology suggest that separating Poecile more adequately expresses these birds' relationships (Gill et al., 2005). The American Ornithologists' Union has been treating Poecile as distinct genus since 1998. Although it and the black-capped chickadee most likely diverged about 2.5 million years ago, the birds still hybridize in the areas where their ranges overlap. The offspring of mated pairs of hybrid chickadees suffer from lower hatching success, and a male bias sex ratio, consistent with Haldane's rule.

Description
Their underparts are white with rusty brown on the flanks; their back is grey. They have a short dark bill, short wings and a moderately long tail. Very similar to the black-capped chickadee, the Carolina chickadee is distinguished by the slightly browner wing with the greater coverts brown (not whitish fringed) and the white fringing on the secondary feathers slightly less conspicuous; the tail is also slightly shorter and more square-ended.

Eggs are about 1.5 cm (0.6 in) long and 1.1 cm (0.4 in) wide. Eggs are white with areas of reddish-brown ranging from dots to small blotches.

Vocalization
The calls and song between the Carolina chickadee and the Black-capped chickadee differ subtly to an experienced ear: the Carolina chickadee's chick-a-dee call is faster and higher pitched than that of the black-capped chickadee, and the Carolina chickadee has a four note fee-bee-fee-bay song, whereas the black-capped omits the high notes. Identification is very difficult even with an excellent view.

The most famous call is the familiar chick-a-dee-dee-dee which gave this bird its name and its song is fee-bee-fee-bay.

Distribution and habitat

Their breeding habitat is mixed or deciduous woods in the United States from New Jersey west to southern Kansas and south to Florida and Texas; there is a gap in the range at high altitudes in the Appalachian Mountains where they are replaced by their otherwise more northern relative, the black-capped chickadee.

They are permanent residents, not usually moving south even in severe winter weather.

Diet
These birds hop along tree branches searching for insects, sometimes hanging upside down or hovering; they may make short flights to catch insects in the air. Insects form a large part of their diet, especially in summer; seeds and berries become important in winter. They sometimes hammer seeds on a tree or shrub to open them; they also will store seeds for later use. Carolina chickadees commonly make use of feeders.

Behavior and breeding 
During the fall migration and winter, chickadees often flock together in flocks of 8–10 birds. Each of the birds in a flock has a rank; while highly ranked birds will remain on the flock's territory for breeding, lower-ranked birds must find new breeding territory. Many other species of birds, including titmice, nuthatches, and warblers can often be found foraging in these flocks. Mixed flocks occur about 50% of the time. Mixed flocks stay together because the chickadees call out whenever they find a good source of food. This calling out forms cohesion for the group, allowing the other birds to find food more efficiently.

Carolina chickadees actively defend individual spaces of 2–5 ft (0.6–1.5 m) apart; if another bird encroaches on these spaces, the dominant bird may make gargle calls. At feeders, these birds will usually take a seed and fly to a branch isolated from other birds to eat it.

These birds usually sleep in cavities, though they may sleep in branches. Different members of a flock will sleep in the same cavity from night to night. While females usually sleep in the nest cavity, males will normally sleep on a nearby branch.

Breeding 
They nest in a hole in a tree; the pair excavates the nest, using a natural cavity or sometimes an old woodpecker nest. They may interbreed with black-capped chickadees where the ranges overlap, which can make identification difficult. The female will build the nest out of moss and strips of bark; she will then line it with hair or plant fibers. Clutches are usually made up of 3–10 eggs with an incubation period of 12–16 days. The nestling period is usually 16–19 days.

Temperature regulation

Carolina chickadees are able to lower their body temperatures to induce an intentional state of hypothermia called torpor. They do this to conserve energy during extremely cold winters. In extremely cold weather conditions they look for cavities where they can hide in and spend up to fifteen hours at a time in torpor; during this time they are awake but unresponsive; they should not be picked up and handled at this time, as the stress of being held may cause their death.

References
Del Hoyo, J., Elliot, A., & Christie D. (eds). (2007). Handbook of the Birds of the World. Volume 12: Picathartes to Tits and Chickadees. Lynx Edicions. 
Gill, F. B., Slikas, B., & Sheldon, F. H. (2005). Phylogeny of titmice (Paridae): II. Species relationships based on sequences of the mitochondrial cytochrome-b gene. Auk 122: 121–143. DOI: 10.1642/0004-8038(2005)122[0121:POTPIS]2.0.CO;2 HTML abstract

Study
 Todd M Freeberg (2006) Social Complexity Can Drive Vocal Complexity: Group Size Influences Vocal Information in Carolina Chickadees. DOI 10.1111/j.1467-9280.2006.01743

External links 

 Carolina chickadee at BirdHouses101.com
 Carolina chickadee bird sound at Florida Museum of Natural History
 
 

Carolina chickadee
Endemic birds of the Eastern United States
Native birds of the Eastern United States
Native birds of the Southeastern United States
Carolina chickadee
Taxa named by John James Audubon